Fox is an unincorporated community  in Carter County in southern Oklahoma, United States. The post office was established January 25, 1894. It is named for Frank M. Fox of the Chickasaw Nation.

Its racially integrated school produced several high school championship football teams, particularly in the late 1970s and early 1980s.

Robert L. Lynn, the president from 1975 to 1997 of Louisiana College in Pineville, Louisiana, graduated in 1949 from Fox High School.

Demographics

References

Unincorporated communities in Carter County, Oklahoma
Unincorporated communities in Oklahoma